GameNight is a weekend evening sports talk radio show on ESPN Radio hosted by a variety of ESPN hosts and contributors, most notably hosted by John Seibel, until he left ESPN in 2009. GameNight is regarded as being the flagship series of ESPN Radio, being the network's first long-form program and airing every night since the network's 1992 debut until July 21, 2008. On that day, the weeknight run was replaced by Football Tonight and SportsCenter Nightly, which was later replaced by The Freddie Coleman Show, followed by Freddie and Fitz/Freddie and Fitzsimmons. Now the show airs weekends from 10pm–2am (originally Saturday 8pm–12am and Sunday 10pm–1am, then both days from 8pm-1am ET). The program features in-game updates, guests ranging from superstars to experts, and in-depth analysis on the day's sports stories. It is broadcast from ESPN headquarters in Bristol, Connecticut.

Guests on GameNight over the years include Mel Kiper Jr., John Clayton, Chris Mortensen, Ric Bucher, Tim Kurkjian, ·and Eric Byrnes. Jeff Rickard currently is the fill-in host. The most notable former host is Chuck Wilson, who was on the program from its debut to July 2005, when his contract expired and was not extended. Other former hosts include sports personalities such as John Seibel, Doug Gottlieb, Keith Olbermann, Tony Bruno, and Mike Tirico.

ESPN Radio SportsCenter airs every thirty minutes throughout GameNight.

A local version of GameNight also airs on CHUM 1050, the flagship of TSN Radio (ESPN Radio's sister network), from Tuesday through Saturday nights.

Several ESPN Radio affiliates do not air this show but instead use GameNight as the brand of their own local evening shows, including:
Note: These shows don't air during play-by-play live coverage

Past

Personalities
Keith Olbermann: (regular, 1992)
Tony Bruno: (regular, 1992–1995)
Mike Tirico: (regular, 1992–1996)
Chuck Wilson: (regular, 1992–2005)
Doug Gottlieb: (regular, 2003–2006)
Andy Gresh: (fill-in, 2007–2008)
Freddie Coleman: (regular, 2004–2008)
Ryen Russillo: (regular, 2006–2008)
Amy Lawrence: (fill-in, 2006–2008)
John Seibel: (regular, 2000–2006, 2009)
Jeff Rickard: (regular, 2006–2008 & fill-in 2009–present)

Format
Until late 2006, GameNight was heard nightly 7pm–1am ET. The program was featured full of segments including: "The Starting Lineups" at the top of every hour, "GameNight Recycles" at the top of the last hour, "The Last Word" at the end of the fifth hour, "Studs and Duds" at the end of the last hour, "Tomorrow's Headlines Tonight" at the end of the fifth hour, "Sound Off" in the middle of the fifth hour, and "Choice Cuts" at the end of the last hour.

Throughout the program, the hosts were also joined by contributors from around the nation giving live in-game updates of a variety of odd sporting events. They were also joined by players after their games to discuss what happened in their game and what they are thinking.

Beginning in late 2006, GameNight was cut back to four hours (and moved to a later timeslot) to make room for The Pulse with Doug Gottlieb, who left GameNight to host his own show.

In 2008, the show was removed from its 10pm ET to 2am ET on weeknights and replaced by Football Tonight and SportsCenter Nightly. The show now airs from 8pm to 1 am on Saturday & Sunday night with John Seibel hosting.

Segments
Starting Lineups: This was when each host shares their views on the sports world. This segment occurs at the beginning of each hour.
Recycles: In this segment, first five hours of the show were summarized in ten minutes. It usually included interviews with the day's biggest stars and experts with sound bites.
The Last Word: This segment was near the end of the show when the hosts play discussions from earlier show like Mike and Mike in the Morning and The Dan Patrick Show and the hosts gave their take on how they feel about the subject.
Tomorrow's Headlines Tonight: In this segment the hosts ran down all of the big news whether sports or not that you would be reading about that next morning, whether it's in the Sports section, the Business section or the Money sections and more.
Studs and Duds: This is when the hosts would review all of the studs of the day and all of the duds of the day.  This occurred near the end of the show.
Fast Break Trivia: This was a trivia game in which the hosts would ask three callers five different questions, which generallyed to a common theme. All of the contestants got ESPN Scene it and the player who gets the most correct answers wins a Sony PlayStation 2.
Champs or Chumps: A spin-off of Studs or Duds, in this segment the host(s) runs down some of the top players or teams and discusses why they are a champ or a chump.
Freddie's Bold Prediction: Started by John Seibel, each Friday night during the college football season, Freddie Coleman makes his bold prediction for an upset on Saturday.
Freddie Coleman's GameNight Challenge: This segment appears every Sunday night when Jeff Rickard will pose Freddie Coleman multiple trivia questions from the past week in sports with respect to history.
Monday Buzz: Somewhat of a spin-off of Tomorrow's Headlines Tonight, each Sunday Coleman and Rickard run down the top stories that your newspapers will be covering tomorrow.
Sound Off: This segment is when the hosts will post questions or topics and ether read or respond to phone calls and e-mails from listeners.
GameNight Guarantees: This segment is on Saturday night where Andy Gresh & Freddie Coleman make their Sunday NFL picks.
Baseball Tonight, College GameNight, NBA Fastbreak, and NFL Quick Hits: These are segments that rundown all of the game scores and news from their respective leagues, such as college basketball, Major League Baseball, the NBA and the NFL.
What's Bugging Me?: A new segment in 2009 where John Seibel will talk about something that's bugging him in the world of sports.
Choice Cuts: This segment is when the big calls and plays from the day's games are replayed over the air. Often during baseball season, they will play one of Ron Santo's outburst to one of the Chicago Cubs plays.

References
ESPN Show page

External links
ESPN Show page
ESPN Radio

ESPN Radio programs
American sports radio programs
Radio programs on XM Satellite Radio